Arthur L. "Bill" Burkholder (June 6, 1892 – July 28, 1952) was an American football player and coach. He played college football for Kansas State from 1911 to 1913 and served as head coach at New Mexico A&M in 1926.

Early years 

A native of Marion, Kansas, he played college football at Kansas State Agricultural from 1911 to 1913 and was an All-Missouri Valley Conference guard. During World War I, he served in the United States Army and played on the 89th Division football team. He worked at the Fort Hays Experiment Station for 10 years.

Coaching career
He served as head coach of the 1926 New Mexico A&M Aggies football team, leading the team to a 5–3–1 record, including four shutout victories.

Later years
Burkholder returned to Kansas in 1930, settling in Plainville where he worked in the cattle business and as a tax accountant. He died from a heart attack in 1952 at age 60. He never married.

Head coaching record

References

1892 births
1952 deaths
American football guards
Kansas State Wildcats football players
New Mexico State Aggies football coaches
People from Marion, Kansas